IL-21 or IL 21 can refer to:
 Interleukin 21
 Illinois's 21st congressional district, an obsolete district
 Illinois Route 21